José Muñoz may refer to:

Sports
 José Muñoz (pitcher) (1881–1945), Cuban and Negro league baseball player
 Jose Munoz (infielder) (born 1967), American baseball player
 José Muñoz (wrestler) (born 1968), Mexican luchador
 Jose Manuel Munoz (born 1983), Spanish trampolinist
 José Luis Muñoz (born 1987), Chilean footballer

Others
 José Antonio Muñoz (born 1942), a.k.a. Muñoz, Argentine artist and cartoonist
 José Muñoz Cortés (1948–1997), curator of the Iveron-Montreal Myrrh-streaming Icon of the Mother of God
 José Esteban Muñoz (1967–2013), U.S. Latino writer, academic
 José Muñoz (born 1978), Spanish flamenco-rock musician in the band Estopa
 José Muñoz Sánchez, Spanish politician